Pioneer's Gold is a 1924 American silent Western film directed by Victor Adamson and starring Kathryn McGuire, Pete Morrison and Virginia Warwick. It was produced by the independent Sanford Productions.

Synopsis
An elderly prospector wants his brother's children to inherit his vast wealth, but a scheming figure plans to bring in two impersonators so he can get his own hands on the inheritance.

Cast
 Kathryn McGuire as Mary Marsden
 Pete Morrison as Jim Hartley
 Virginia Warwick as Marie La Monte
 Spottiswoode Aitken as Bob Hartley 
 Louise Emmons as Mother La Monte
 Madge Lorese Bates as Goldie
 Merrill McCormick as Pascale
 Les Bates as Jeff Kerr aka The Fox
 George King as Tsu Tsi
 George Sowards as Stage driver

References

Bibliography
 Connelly, Robert B. The Silents: Silent Feature Films, 1910-36, Volume 40, Issue 2. December Press, 1998.
 Munden, Kenneth White. The American Film Institute Catalog of Motion Pictures Produced in the United States, Part 1. University of California Press, 1997.

External links
 

1924 films
1924 Western (genre) films
American silent feature films
Silent American Western (genre) films
Films directed by Victor Adamson
American black-and-white films
1920s English-language films
1920s American films